This is a list of cities in ancient Epirus. These were Greek poleis, komes or fortresses except for Nicopolis, which was founded by Octavian. Classical Epirus was divided into three regions: Chaonia, Molossia, Thesprotia, each named after the dominant tribe that lived there. A number of ancient settlements in these regions remain unidentified.

Cities

Chaonia
Amantia, main settlement of the Amantes
Antigonia (Chaonia), polis founded by Pyrrhus of Epirus
Artichia, polis
Aulon, modern-day Vlorë, first attested in the 2nd century AD
Baiake pre-Hellenistic polis
Bouthroton, Chaonian polis
Cestrine or Cammania, modern-day Filiates
Chimaera (Chaonia), or Chimera (polis) Chaonian polis, modern-day Himara
Hekatompedon, pre-Hellenistic polis
Olympe, polis in the region of the Amantes
Onchesmos, pre-Hellenistic polis, modern-day Saranda
Orikos, founded by Euboeans  Euboeans colony
Panormos (Epirus) or Panormus (Epirus), pre-Hellenistic polis
Phanoteia, polis
Phoenice,  chief polis of the Chaonians, modern-day Finiq
Photike, pre-Hellenistic polis, modern-day Paramythia
Thronion, colony of the Euboeans - Locrians

Molossia
Dodona,  sanctuary, the second most important oracle in ancient Greece after Delphi
Eurymenai (Epirus),  polis
Orraon, founded 385 BC polis
Passaron, polis

Thesprotia
Bouneima pre Hellenistic
Korkyra (polis) polis
Tekmona or Tekmon  polis
Charadros (Epirus) pre Hellenistic
Chyton founded by Ionians from Klazomenai
Zmaratha polis
Gitanae polis
Elateia (Epirus) founded by Elisians  polis
Batiai founded by Elisians polis
Thesprotia (polis) pre Hellenistic
Trampya pre Hellenistic
Helikranon pre Hellenistic
Ilium (Epirus) pre Hellenistic
Elina (Epirus) pre Hellenistic
Elaias Limen pre Hellenistic
Sybota pre Hellenistic
Cheimerion pre Hellenistic
Ephyra (Epirus) or Kichyros founded by Chaonians in Parthenius's story of Anthippe  polis
Oropos (Epirus) pre Hellenistic
Toryne or Torone polis
Pandosia (Epirus) founded by Elisians  polis
Elaea founded by Corinthians polis
Bucheta founded by Elisians  polis
Cassope pre Hellenistic
Elatria founded by Elisians
Poionos  polis
Berenike (Epirus)  polis
Kastrosykia

See also 
List of ancient Epirotes
List of Ancient Greek tribes
List of ancient Greek cities
List of ancient Greeks
List of cities in ancient Acarnania

References

Populated places established in the 1st millennium BC
 
Former populated places in Greece
Chaonia
Thesprotia
Epirus